Fredric H. Honebein (born April 1, 1968, in Tiburon, California) is an American rower. He finished 5th in the men's eight at the 1996 Summer Olympics.

References 

 

1968 births
Living people
People from Tiburon, California
Rowers at the 1996 Summer Olympics
Olympic rowers of the United States
World Rowing Championships medalists for the United States
American male rowers
Pan American Games medalists in rowing
Pan American Games gold medalists for the United States
Rowers at the 1995 Pan American Games